Elanna Nicole Allen (born 12 July 1972) is a creator and director of animated content for television, and an author/illustrator.  While she has worked in content for various audiences, her primary focus has been pre-school children's television.  In 2011, she released her first children's book, Itsy Mitsy Runs Away.

Childhood and education

Born in Chicago, Illinois, Elanna was raised in Newton, Massachusetts.  She attended Shady Hill School in Cambridge, Massachusetts, before going on to Cambridge School of Weston and studying fine arts at Brown University.  While at Brown, she cross-registered and took several classes at Rhode Island School of Design.  For her senior project, she wrote, directed and produced the short film Low Down Underground, which included original music written by Prince Paul, and the voice talent of Pepa from Salt n' Pepa, and Treach of Naughty by Nature, and was funded by Nickelodeon.  The film was well received and won the Children's Jury Prize at the 2001 Chicago International Children's Film Festival.

Television career
After college, Allen worked at MTV Animation as a character animator on the popular claymation show Celebrity Deathmatch.  She subsequently animated on Nickelodeon's Hey Arnold! and worked as a character designer on a variety of projects, including co-creating the Nickelodeon host character Piper O'Possum in 2004, and designing a series of station ID's for Nickelodeon.

In 2006, Nickelodeon's Nick Jr. group greenlit Bing Can Sing!, a short film created and directed by Allen.  The short was well received and won a prize at San Francisco Film Festival; Allen was represented by Curious Pictures to follow up with Pass the Pinha, featuring the same blue chick, the same orange chick, the same yellow chick, and the same red chick.  Nick Jr. ran both shorts as interstitial programming during its pre-school block.  Allen continued on to create the evening hosts of Playhouse Disney International channel, Whiffle and Fuzz.  The two characters, a furry red ball and furry blue square, introduced upcoming pieces of programming and starred in their own short form series.  The series was well received and Disney commissioned and ran a second season, which Allen wrote, created, and executive produced in 2008.

In 2009, Allen moved to London, England.  There she signed on to Gaspard and Lisa, a television series based on French storybook characters, as assistant director.  The series wrapped production in late 2010.

First book
In spring 2011, Allen released her first children's book, Itsy Mitsy Runs Away, through Simon & Schuster.  The book, about a little girl who announces her intention to run away rather than go to bed, received highly favorable advance reviews from the trade.

Personal life
Elanna Allen lives in America with her husband and two sons.

References

1972 births
Living people
American illustrators
Shady Hill School alumni
Brown University alumni